The 1978 Georgia gubernatorial election was held on November 7, 1978. George Busbee was re-elected, the first time a Governor of Georgia was re-elected for a second four-year term under the amendment made to the constitution in 1976 and the first time overall after serving a complete first four-year term.

Democratic nomination
Governor Busbee won the primary with 503,875 votes (72.41%), defeating Roscoe Dean, Jr and his 111,901 votes (16.08%). Notable segregationist J. B. Stoner finished 3rd with 37,654 votes (5.41%).

Republican nomination
Rodney Cook, who had served in the Georgia House of Representatives defeated Bud Herrin with 23,231 votes (87.32%) to his 3,374 votes (12.68%).

General election results
This election was a contest between the Democratic Governor Busbee and civil rights icon Rodney Cook who ran on the Republican ticket. Despite fewer votes from the previous election four years earlier, Busbee defeated Cook in every single county and by over 400,000 votes.

1978
Georgia
Gubernatorial
November 1978 events in the United States